Bridgeton Historic District may refer to:
Bridgeton Historic District (Bridgeton, Indiana)
Bridgeton Historic District (Bridgeton, New Jersey)